Joseph Meyten (born 18 February 1947) is a Belgian former swimmer. He competed in the men's 100 metre butterfly at the 1968 Summer Olympics.

References

External links
 

1947 births
Living people
Belgian male butterfly swimmers
Olympic swimmers of Belgium
Swimmers at the 1968 Summer Olympics
Swimmers from Antwerp